Sanam is a modern village in Sudan. It is located at the bank of the Nile river next to Merowe.

Here were found the remains of an ancient town which flourished mainly in the Napatan Period. These are perhaps the remains of Napata, the capital of the Kushite empire from about 800 to 300 BC. Parts of the town were excavated in 1912 to 1913 by Francis Llewellyn Griffith. He found the remains of a badly preserved temple and of a building he called treasury. The temple was built under king Taharqo with additions by king Aspelta. Most importantly, he excavated a big cemetery belonging to the inhabitants of the town. This is one of the few so far excavated cemeteries of this period belonging to "common" people.

References 

Archaeological sites in Sudan
Ancient cities
Kingdom of Kush